Miguasha Provincial Park (French: Parc national de Miguasha) is a protected area near Carleton-sur-Mer on the Gaspé Peninsula of Quebec in Canada. Created in 1985 by the Government of Quebec, Miguasha was designated a World Heritage Site in 1999 in recognition of its wealth of fossils, which display a crucial time during the evolution of life on Earth. Other names for this site are the Miguasha Fossil Site, the Bay of Escuminac Fossil Site, the Upper Devonian Escuminac Formation, and the Hugh-Miller Cliffs. It is also sometimes referred to on fossil specimens as 'Scaumenac Bay' or 'Scaumenac Bay P.Q.'

Miguasha Natural History Museum 

The park's museum features exhibits about the fossils and paleontology of the park.  The museum's collection includes over 9,000 specimens of fossil fish and plants.

Geology 
The coastal cliffs are Upper Devonian strata of grey sedimentary rock belonging to the Escuminac Formation. They are composed of alternating layers of sandstone and shale, which are 350–375 million years old. The area today supports mainly birch, aspen, and fir forests.

Palaeontological significance 
Some of the fish, fauna, and spore fossils found at Miguasha are rare and ancient species. For example, Spermasporites is thought to be one of the oldest flowering plant genera on Earth.

History

See also 
 List of fossil sites (with link directory)

References

External links 

 Official Website
 Parcs Québec: Parc National de Miguasha (english)
 UNEP-WCMC profile
 World Heritage List: Miguasha National Park

Gaspé Peninsula
Paleozoic paleontological sites of North America
National parks of Quebec
World Heritage Sites in Canada
Museums in Gaspésie–Îles-de-la-Madeleine
Natural history museums in Canada
Tourist attractions in Gaspésie–Îles-de-la-Madeleine
Protected areas of Gaspésie–Îles-de-la-Madeleine
Fossil parks in Canada
Paleontology in Canada
Devonian paleontological sites
Paleontology in Quebec
1985 establishments in Quebec
Protected areas established in 1985